Erwin David Rabhan (born September 9, 1926) is an American businessman from Savannah, Georgia. He is a longtime friend of former U.S. President Jimmy Carter and he served as the pilot for Carter's first campaign for governor of Georgia in 1970. Rabhan was imprisoned in Iran for nearly 11 years, from September 1979 to August 6, 1990. He was initially charged with breaking Iranian financial laws and then later charged with spying, though he was never officially charged. It was speculated that he was targeted due to his friendship with Carter. Rabhan described his lengthy prison experience as a "conscious coma... I feel like a real Rip van Winkle."

Rabhan arrived back in the U.S. on September 14, 1990, flying into Atlanta's Hartsfield Airport. Former President Carter greeted him there upon his arrival. Carter had advocated for his friend's release from imprisonment, and referred to him as a "hostage" of Iran. He privately asked the U.S. State Department to declare him a hostage, but that was never done.

Rabhan wrote about his experiences in the 2004 book Conscious Coma: Ten Years in an Iranian Prison.

Early life and education
Rabhan was born to a prominent Iranian Jewish family in Savannah, Georgia, where he grew up. In 1943, he graduated from Benedictine Military Academy in Savannah. In 1949, he graduated from University of Georgia with a Bachelor of Science degree in agriculture.

See also
 List of foreign nationals detained in Iran

References

1926 births
Living people
Writers from Savannah, Georgia
American people imprisoned in Iran
20th-century American businesspeople
American people of Iranian-Jewish descent
University of Georgia alumni
Businesspeople from Georgia (U.S. state)